Love This City is the fourth studio album by Australian band The Whitlams, released by Black Yak through Warner in 1999. It peaked at No. 3 on the ARIA Albums Chart.

Track listing

"Make the World Safe" – 3:43
"Thank You (for Loving Me at My Worst)" – 3:59
"Chunky Chunky Air Guitar" – 3:04
"Pretty as You" – 4:48
"You Gotta Love This City" – 5:11
"God Drinks at the Sando" – 2:53
"Blow Up the Pokies" – 3:27
"400 Miles from Darwin" – 3:37
"Time" – 3:32
"Made Me Hard" – 3:34
"High Ground" – 3:46
"Unreliable" – 2:29
"Her Floor Is My Ceiling" – 5:51
"There's No One" – 5:05

Charts

Weekly charts

Year-end charts

Certifications

References

External links
Official site

The Whitlams albums
1999 albums
Warner Music Group albums